Marck is a commune in the Pas-de-Calais department in the Hauts-de-France region of France.

Geography
Marck is a farming and light industrial town located 6 km east of Calais, at the junction of the D940 and D248 roads. The A26 autoroute (‘autoroute des Anglais’) passes through the commune and the Louis Blériot airport is in the middle of the commune. The small villages of Les Hemmes-de-Marck and Fort-Vert, both on the D191 road, are included in the population. Calais–Dunkerque Airport is situated in the commune.

Politics 
Pierre-Henri Dumont served as the Mayor from 2014 to 2017.

Demographic evolution

The commune has three elementary schools and one middle school.

Main sights
 The church of St. Martin, dating from the twentieth century, is an official historical monument since January 17, 2002. The original church, dated from the 15th century, was destroyed with explosives in 1944 during World War II.
 There is a headstone placed in memory of those who perished during the bombing of Rue Du Sable in Marck on September 28, 1944 by the Allied Forces. This bombing killed over 30 inhabitants and injured many, the largest Marck had ever faced at one time. This street was subsequently renamed Rue du 28 Septembre in memory of this terrible tragedy.
 The brick tower of an old windmill.
 There is a war memorial at the center of the town with the names of town locals that were killed during World War I, World War II and other subsequent wars.

See also
 Communes of the Pas-de-Calais department
 AS Marck

References

Communes of Pas-de-Calais
Pale of Calais